Bruce Wakefield (born 7 November 1960) is a New Zealand lawn bowler. He won the silver medal, along with teammates Mark Noble and Barry Wynks, in the Open para-sport triples event at the 2018 Commonwealth Games.

References

External links
 

1960 births
Living people
New Zealand male bowls players
Bowls players at the 2018 Commonwealth Games
Commonwealth Games medallists in lawn bowls
Commonwealth Games silver medallists for New Zealand
People from Waimate
Sportspeople from Canterbury, New Zealand
20th-century New Zealand people
21st-century New Zealand people
Medallists at the 2018 Commonwealth Games